The Istanbul Friday League was founded in 1912, and replaced the Istanbul Sunday League in 1915. Seven clubs took part in the league when it was first founded in 1912: Anadoluspor, Darülfünun, Terbiye-i Bedeniye, Türk İdman Ocağı, Mümaresatı Bedeniye, Şehremini, and Fenerbahçe S.K.

Champions

Past winners

Defunct football leagues in Turkey
1912 establishments in the Ottoman Empire
Sport in Istanbul
1923 disestablishments in Turkey
Sports leagues established in 1912
Sports leagues disestablished in 1923